Bobbio Pellice (French: Bobbi) is a comune (municipality) in the Metropolitan City of Turin in the Italian region Piedmont, located about  southwest of Turin, on the border with France and at the end of the Val Pellice

Bobbio Pellice borders the following municipalities: Abriès (France), Crissolo, Prali, Ristolas (France), and Villar Pellice. Bobbio was the hometown of the Occitan colonists who populated Guardia Piemontese, in Calabria.

Main sights
 Giardino Botanico Alpino "Bruno Peyronel", an alpine botanical garden
Monte Meidassa
Monte Granero

References

Cities and towns in Piedmont